Varnam (meaning ‘colours’) is a social enterprise that has been working with artisans in Channapatna, Karnataka in India, for over 4  years. It has produced a series of designs interpreting this 200-year-old toy-making craft in the home and lifestyle, women's accessories space, giving tradition a contemporary twist. Using traditional lac-turnery methods popularised by the traditional Channapatna toys range, the label produces home and lifestyle products, toys and jewellery.

History
Varnam was started in late 2011  by Karthik Vaidyanathan, who had just designed his own new home in Bengaluru in the Chettinad Style – one visitors appreciated for its interiors and his use of the traditional 'khana' fabric in soft furnishings. It was Karthik's mother who, driven by demand from her friends, "casually suggested that I do a small exhibition of soft furnishings for friends, similar to the ones I had done for her". The exhibition was a runaway success, and there lay the seed for doing something creative involving traditional fabric in home décor – Varnam began its journey with soft furnishings but soon embraced the founder's love for the Channapatna craft.

Channapatna toys are a particular form of wooden toys (and dolls) that are manufactured in the town of Channapatna in the State of Karnataka, India. As a result of the popularity of these toys, Channapatna is known as Gombegala Ooru (toy-town) of Karnataka. Traditionally, the work involved lacquering the wood of the Wrightia tinctoria tree, colloquially called Aale mara (ivory-wood). The origin of these toys can be traced to the reign of Tipu Sultan who invited artisans from Persia to train the local artisans in the making of wooden toys.

Conscious of its historical significance, Karthik spent the first few weeks were spent visiting the artisans and observing their production processes while gaining hands-on experience. He then started working with the artisans one design at a time. "While I make my own designs, I usually sit with the artisans and discuss the designs and there are invariably some changes, since the craft has many restrictions," he once stated.

A few months later he came out with a jewellery range and a children's range of toys at Varnam. In 2014, after selling on the internet and through certain retail stores across the city, the brand's first flagship store, called the Varnam Store, was started at Indiranagar in Bengaluru.

Social Enterprise
Varnam closely trains and employs women artisans of Channapatna. In an industry where more than 90% of the artisans are men, many of Varnam's products have been handcrafted by women artisans. Proceeds from the sale of Varnam products go into the design and production of more innovative products while striving to keep the craftswomen employed. Varnam works with a team of 20 artisans and two artisan clusters, who are either paid a monthly stipend or on a per product basis. “Plans are afoot to introduce a pension scheme for artisans and provide them performance-based incentives apart from loans at zero per cent interest to buy raw materials,” Karthik explains.

A recipient of the Kyoorius Design Awards 2013 in Design Craft and Packaging, and Confederation of Indian Industry (CII) Design Excellence award for its ‘Oinkston tableware’ series 2013 and the CII Design Excellence award for visual communication and packaging 2014, Varnam also trains and works with interns of well-known design institutes.

Founder
Karthik Vaidyanathan, hails from the Chettinad region of South India.  Born and brought up in Mumbai he currently resides in Bengaluru. An Engineer-MBA by qualification, Karthik has worked for over 16 years in the media industry - music, radio and cable television with companies such as Sony Music, WorldSpace Satellite Radio & Radio City among others. In 2011, he started Varnam as a label manufacturing soft furnishings with traditional fabrics. He found a void when it came to well-designed Indian toys, and Varnam was started to aim to make the waning art form relevant in the modern world.

As the brand matured, Karthik started spending more time the Varnam enterprise. In 2012, he quit his corporate job for a part-time gig to be able dedicate more time to Varnam.

Design Philosophy

Channapatna, called the gingerbread house of lacquer, handicraft have traditionally been characterised by their distinct use of bright colours and highly lustrous lac finish.

Varnam has been credited with bringing modern aesthetic sensibilities and design philosophies to a traditional craft. Products usually have utilitarian aspect as evidenced in the Oinkston range of tableware and others. This enables these traditional-crafted products to be showcased on par with more contemporary products in lifestyle stores and other outlets and has been largely responsible for the resurgence of public interest in Channapatna arts and crafts.

In an interview with New Indian Express, Karthik explained his design philosophy: “Varnam (colours) is an ode to colourful India. I have attempted to bring my aesthetic sensibilities and design philosophy to traditional crafts. The idea is to reorient our crafts to the modern context by ensuring that each design has a practical value and is relevant today.” Varnam products often double as creative games and puzzles. The packaging is also often accompanied by a note about the animals and traditional motifs used in the design of Varnam products.

Varnam has also brought modern manufacturing ideas into the traditional craft. The design has been primarily templatised to ensure a consistent profile and create a distinct visual aesthetic identity. Products ship with dimensional characteristics, graphic usage, and care instructions, allowing the artisans to access a wider audience with modern sensibilities. Boxes have been standardised to ease flows through e-retail channels.

In relation to the artisans, Varnam's attempt has been to enhance the sense of pride amongst the skillful master craftsmen and ensure this craft's continuity by becoming a Fair Trade Associate; so they don't leave their traditional crafts for industry/factory ‘jobs’.

Accreditation
Varnam is also certified by Craftmark, which is initiated by All India Artisans Welfare Association (AIACA) that endorses authentic handmade products with a reassurance of quality and integrity.

The Channapatna toy craft itself is protected as a Geographical Indication (GI) under the World Trade Organization, administered by the Government of Karnataka.

Awards

 Winner of two Blue Elephants at Kyoorius-D&AD Design awards 2013 in two categories – packaging & design craft 
 Winner of CII-NID Design Excellence Award 2013 – ‘Industrial design-home products’ category for the ‘Oinkston tableware’ series
 Winner of CII-NID Design Excellence Award 2014 – ‘Visual communication’ overall category award and ‘Packaging Design’ Award.

References

External links 
 Varnam's Official Website
 Vernam's Sharing Website

Social enterprises